Dakshayagnam is a 1962 Indian Telugu-language Hindu mythological film, produced and directed by Kadaru Nagabhushanam under the Varalakshmi Pictures banner. It stars S. V. Ranga Rao, Devika, and N. T. Rama Rao, with music composed by Saluri Hanumantha Rao. This was N. T. Rama Rao's 100th film which was also dubbed in Tamil with the same title.

Plot 
The film begins with Daksha Prajapathi (S. V. Ranga Rao) becoming the king of the Prajapathis, all the gods give him the most effective powers and an oath that no one will cross his words. After that, he is blessed with 2 sons and also adopts 27 girls. Soon after, Adi Parashakti was born as his daughter Sathi (Devika), who is the greatest devotee of Lord Shiva (N. T. Rama Rao). Daksha performs his 27 daughters' marriage with Lord Chandra (Rama Krishna). After the marriage, Chandra spends most of his time with Rohini (Rajasri) and ignores the others when it was brought to Daksha's notice he curses Chandra to die out of T.B. disease. Here Chandra prays to Lord Shiva, then he gives a boon to protect him. Enraged Daksha clashes with Shiva and the war erupts. Lord Vishnu intervenes and makes a compromise by making Chandra into two. Daksha, however, maintains his grudge against Lord Shiva; when he learns his daughter Sathi is in love with Shiva. To prevent this, eventually, he seeks an alliance with his daughter. But Sathi marries Shiva against her father's wish, so, Daksha decides to insult Shiva by performing a sacrifice without inviting Shiva. Sathi wants to attend the sacrifice and visits uninvitedly ignoring the advice of her husband where she has to endure many insults. At last, when Daksha started insulting her husband, she could not bear it and immolated herself in the sacrificial fire. Hearing it, Lord Shiva makes a ferocious dance called Rudra Tandava and wakes up Veerabhadra from his hair, who destroys the sacrifice and decapitates Daksha. At last, at the request of Daksha's wife Vairini (Kannamba) Shiva forgives Daksha and brings him back to life-giving him a goat's head instead of his own. The place where Lord Siva blessed Sarangadhara a temple adored been by the name Draksharama temple near Rajamahendravaram till today.

Cast 
S. V. Ranga Rao as Daksha
Devika as Sati Devi
N. T. Rama Rao as Lord Shiva
Kannamba as Vairini
V. Nagayya as Dadhichi Maharshi
Rajanala as Indra
Ramakrishna as Chandra
Mikkilineni as Lord Brahma
Padmanabham as Daksha's Younger son
Suri Babu as Nandi
Raghuramaiah as Narada Maharshi
Balakrishna as Daksha's Elder son
Dr. Sivaramakrishnaiah
Rajasree as Rohini
Chayadevi
Meena Kumari
Vasanthi
Ambika Sukumaran as urvasi

Soundtrack 
Music composed by Saluri Hanumantha Rao. Lyrics were written by Aarudhra.

References

External links 
 
 

1960s Telugu-language films
Films scored by S. Hanumantha Rao
1962 films
Hindu mythological films
Films based on the Bhagavata Purana